The 1981 Norwegian Football Cup was the 76th edition of the Norwegian annual knockout football tournament. The Cup was won by Lillestrøm after beating Moss in the cup final with the score 3–1. This was Lillestrøm's third Norwegian Cup title.

First round

|colspan="3" style="background-color:#97DEFF"|26 May 1981

|-
|colspan="3" style="background-color:#97DEFF"|27 May 1981

|-
|colspan="3" style="background-color:#97DEFF"|28 May 1981

|-
|colspan="3" style="background-color:#97DEFF"|2 June 1981

|-
|colspan="3" style="background-color:#97DEFF"|3 June 1981

|-
|colspan="3" style="background-color:#97DEFF"|4 June 1981

|-
|colspan="3" style="background-color:#97DEFF"|10 June 1981

|-
|colspan="3" style="background-color:#97DEFF"|Replay: 4 June 1981

|-
|colspan="3" style="background-color:#97DEFF"|Replay: 8 June 1981

|-
|colspan="3" style="background-color:#97DEFF"|Replay: 10 June 1981

|-
|colspan="3" style="background-color:#97DEFF"|Replay: 11 June 1981

|}

Second round

|colspan="3" style="background-color:#97DEFF"|23 June 1981

|-
|colspan="3" style="background-color:#97DEFF"|24 June 1981

|-
|colspan="3" style="background-color:#97DEFF"|25 June 1981

|-
|colspan="3" style="background-color:#97DEFF"|Replay: 1 July 1981

|-
|colspan="3" style="background-color:#97DEFF"|Replay: 2 July 1981

|-
|colspan="3" style="background-color:#97DEFF"|Replay: 8 July 1981

|}

Third round

|colspan="3" style="background-color:#97DEFF"|8 July 1981

|-
|colspan="3" style="background-color:#97DEFF"|9 July 1981

|-
|colspan="3" style="background-color:#97DEFF"|12 July 1981

|}

Fourth round

|colspan="3" style="background-color:#97DEFF"|5 August 1981

|-
|colspan="3" style="background-color:#97DEFF"|Replay: 20 August 1981

|}

Quarter-finals

|colspan="3" style="background-color:#97DEFF"|30 August 1981

|}

Semi-finals

Final

Lillestrøm's winning team: Arne Amundsen, Erik Solér, Frank Grønlund, Tore Kordahl,
Tor Inge Smedås, Bård Bjerkeland, Ole Dyrstad, Tom Lund, Gunnar Lønstad,
André Krogsæter and Roger Sjåstad, (Subs: Jon Erik Andersen, Thor Helge Bergan, Stein Eilertsen and Arne Dokken.)

Moss's team: Odd Skauen, Jon Pettersen, Hans Deunk, Morten Vinje,
Svein Grøndalen, Roar Breivik, (Per Otto Karlsen from 53.), 
Stein Kollshaugen, Per Heliaz, Geir Henæs, Ole Johnny Henriksen, 
Kurt Tunheim and (Jan Erik Fredriksen from 86.).

References 
http://www.rsssf.no

Norwegian Football Cup seasons
Norway
Football Cup